Shoot the Living and Pray for the Dead is the original release title of the 1971 Italian dramatic Spaghetti Western film directed by Giuseppe Vari, and starring Klaus Kinski and Dante Maggio. With its many international releases, the film had additional English titles of Pray to Kill and Return Alive, To Kill a Jackal, and Renegade Gun. The script by Adriano Bolzoni is inspired by American noir-crime films of the 1930s and 1940s, and Kinski's entry into the scene reprises Edward G. Robinson's presence in Key Largo (1948).

Plot
After having robbed a bank for $100,000 in gold bars, Dan Hogan (Klaus Kinski) and his gang meet up at the Jackal's Ranch stagecoach way station near the Mexican border, where Hogan's girlfriend Eleanor (Victoria Zinny) is to surreptitiously bring their stolen gold to them. While they await her arrival, they encounter John Webb (Paolo Casella), a stranger who had shot the man who was to be their guide and who himself wants half their gold in exchange for leading them into Mexico.  Hogan agrees and they depart into the desert with the law close behind. In fact, Webb plots to destroy the gang as Hogan, during his earlier days with the Ku Klux Klan, had killed Webb's father.

Cast
Klaus Kinski as Dan Hogan
Paolo Casella as John Webb
Dante Maggio as Jonathan
Dino Strano as Reed
Patrizia Adiutori as Santa
Goffredo Unger as Skelton
Aldo Barberito as Greene
Victoria Zinny as Eleanor
Anna Zinnemann as Daisy
John Ely
Anthony Rock
Fortunato Arena
Adriana Giuffrè
Gianni Pulone

Production
The film was shot simultaneously with The Last Traitor (Il tredicesimo è sempre Giuda), another Spaghetti Western that was also directed and written by Vari and Bolzoni.

Releases
First released theatrically as Prega il morto e ammazza il vivo in Italy on 31 August 1971, the film was distributed internationally under different titles. In West Germany it was released as Der Mörder des Klans. In its 24 May 1972 French release, it was Priez les morts, tuez les vivants.   On release on cable television in Brazil it was titled Mata o Vivo E Reza Pelo Morto. When first released in the United States, it was as Pray to Kill and Return Alive, while its international release title in English was Renegade Gun. Subsequently it was also released as To Kill a Jackal and then Shoot the Living and Pray for the Dead. It was released in Finland as Rukous kuolleiden puolesta. In its 19 September 1973 release in Sweden it was as Skjut de levande - bed för de döda, while in Portugal on 28 July 1975, it was as Reza Pelo Morto e Mata o Vivo, and its latest US release was as To Kill a Jackal.

DVD release
The German DVD release quality is considered very good, with the image being clean and sharp. The German language dubbing is well done but the English language dubbing is a bit dull. DVD extras include a picture gallery showing stills of the film, as well as stills of international poster artwork, clips of other Klaus Kinski projects, and trailers for other Koch Media films.

Reception
Of its German release, Das Filmmagazin said that there was nothing wrong in principle for Klaus Kinski to be in this Spaghetti Western even though the actor and genre have been in better productions. The role of Dan Hogan was a perfect opportunity for Kinski to create a character who was an ice cold lunatic on the verge. Das Filmmagazin also felt that the reduced scope of the limited locations of the coach station and the desert allowed the director to use hand-held shots to create a surreal tonality. The wobbling close-ups of faces captured intensity of expressions, short shots with wide focal lengths, tilted camera angles, and other unusual camera work were used to generate mood. They summarised by writing "Ein spannender, nahezu minimalistischer Italowestern, der zwar nicht mit den Besten seines Fachs mithalten kann, aber in der zweiten Liga eine ziemlich gute Figur macht." (An exciting, almost minimalist Spaghetti Western, which, although it cannot compete with the best in its field, makes a pretty good figure in the second division). The Spaghetti Western Database calls the film a "thoroughly interesting mystery thriller disguised as a Western" and representative of "one of the best examples of the forgotten gems of the Spaghetti Western". On the other hand, Italian film critic Paolo Mereghetti criticized the film, calling it "an absolutely conventional western, with a Kinski to the minimum of his actorial capabilities". In his review for the website Sense of View, Carsten Henkelmann, while highlighting the lack of rhythm ("The action is for the most part very quiet, the narration is quite slow"), praised the originality of the plot ("it is a Western that uses the usual gunfights as a last resort").

In his investigation of narrative structures in Spaghetti Western films, Fridlund counts Shoot the Living and Pray for the Dead among the many stories about an infiltrator with a hidden agenda that took their inspiration from A Fistful of Dollars.

Quentin Tarantino ranked the film 16th in his personal "Top 20 favorite Spaghetti Westerns".

References

External links

1971 films
1971 drama films
1971 Western (genre) films
Italian drama films
1970s Italian-language films
Films directed by Giuseppe Vari
Spaghetti Western films
1970s Italian films